Cuthlie railway station served the area near Cuthlie Farm in Cuthlie, Angus, Scotland from 1900 to 1965 on the Carmyllie Railway.

History 
The station opened on 1 February 1900. To the north was a siding which was shown on OS maps to exist only after the station was built. The station closed to passengers on 2 December 1929 and to goods traffic on 26 May 1965.

References

External links 

Disused railway stations in Angus, Scotland
Former Dundee and Arbroath Railway stations
Railway stations in Great Britain opened in 1900
Railway stations in Great Britain closed in 1929
1900 establishments in Scotland
1929 disestablishments in Scotland